Nadiya Kollappetta Rathri (English: Night of Nadiya's Murder) is a 2007 Malayalam thriller film by K. Madhu starring Suresh Gopi and Kavya Madhavan in lead roles. The film's plot is inspired by the 2007 Thai movie Alone which itself is loosely based on Agatha Christie's novel Elephants Can Remember.

Plot
  
Internationally famous Indian sharp shooter Nadiya Mether  catches Sauparnika Express, a train on its inaugural run between Chennai and Mangalore. She is stabbed en route but is not the only victim on the train. A famous dancer, Thulasimani and a television reporter, Shreya Maria, are also killed during the same journey and in the same compartment. When the investigators fail to solve the mystery, the case is finally turned over to 
DIG Sharafuddeen Taramasi IPS, a Tamil Nadu cadre IPS officer and an encounter specialist from the Railway Anti-Criminal Task Force (RACT).

RACT discovers that the three murders are not inter-connected, rather it was sheer coincidence that they all happened the same night. The passengers in the compartment during the inaugural journey apart from the three victims were an actress Priya Rose, her mother Rajamma  and father, four doctors returning from a medical conference, a Tamil Novelist Seetharaman, Palakkad Railway SP Alexander, Madhavan Master, his wife and their mentally unstable son Balachandran "Balu". TTR Muthuraj  and attender Sundareshan are also present.

As the train reaches Madukarai station, Balu is spotted with a blade in hand apparently after stabbing Nadiya who goes unconscious. Simultaneously Shreya goes missing only to be found dead later near Salem, and Thulasimani is found dead hanging on the roof of her coupe which was locked from the inside. The coach is removed from the train for investigation and SI Mayilvahanam  questions all of the passengers having no answer to either of the cases.

Upon questioning Muthuraj, he reveals to Sharafuddeen about meeting an additional passenger that night, who is identified as Lakkidi Manikandan, a killer in disguise of a police constable. After severe questioning Mani admits killing Shreya, the reporter. She was behind Alexander IPS, who was highly indulged in smuggling. Shreya followed him into the train and into the compartment, to make a hot story about the goods he carried on board. However, Alexender overhears Shreya's mobile conversations, which makes him suspicious and discovers her identity card from her bag. He arranged Mani to kill her, and when the train reached near Salem, Shreya is thrown away from the moving train, which kills her.

After getting Seetharaman's statement, Sharafuddeen questions Balu who was spotted first near a seemingly-dead Nadiya. It was Dr. Mathangi, one of the doctors in the compartment who spotted Balu with a surgical blade in hand and thereby informed all her co-passengers. Madhavan master spots that Nadiya is still alive and asks everyone to take her to the hospital. In the present-day Balu undergoes treatment at a mental asylum and in his subconscious mind, reveals to Sharafuddeen that he came out of his coupe that night to meet Priya who was his crush during college days, but sees a stabbed and injured Nadiya instead with the blade used to stab her left behind. As Balu took the blade in hand for checking, Mathangi sees him thereby leading to the rest of the events.

With the help of Mayilvahanam, Sharafuddeen apprehends Priya and her mother Rajamma who are indulged in smuggling of gold. The latter reveals that she had borrowed a surgical blade from the doctors to slice mangoes. When it is revealed that the same blade was used to stab Nadiya, Rajamma reveals that they have no connection with the murder. She also tells that during the journey, Priya inadvertently ran into Madhavan who is angry at her as well as her mother who are responsible for Balu's mental problems. And while looking for Madhavan, Rajamma spots someone entering Thulasimani's coupe but couldn't identify the person. However in an identification parade arranged by Sharafuddeen, Rajamma reveals that it was attender Sundareshan who entered the coupe that night. Upon being questioned, Sundaran reveals that he is the murderer. Since the reasons given by him are unconvincing, Sharafuddeen attempts to torture him that forces Sundaran to reveal the truth - he committed the murder of Thulasimani on the orders of his boss, the division manager Vijayabhanu. Vijaybhanu was the husband of Thulasi's sister and fell madly in love with Thulasi. He approached her numerous times but was rejected by Thulsi. She threatened to disclose the approaches of Vijayabhanu to everyone and also secretly married her boyfriend Makarand from Mangaluru, which provoked Vijayabhanu to kill her before she reached home.

However the most complicated case was that of Nadiya. She appeared to be brutally assaulted with teeth marks on her body and nerves to her brains being cut. Sharafuddeen goes behind Nadiya and finds that she along with her identical twin sister Nadira were orphans, and their father was Zakriya Mether, a goon and arms dealer, who was killed by a special team led by Sharafuddeen while he was posted in the'Q' Branch of Tamil Nadu Police years ago. The sisters were raised by eminent dancer Janaki Iyer at her academy in Kanjikode. Nadira grew up to be a professional dancer, while Nadiya became an acclaimed shooter, holding a grudge against Sharaufuddeen for killing her father before her eyes. Their foster mother Janaki died, leaving all her properties to the twins, which was now managed by Aadilakshmi, their manager and her brother Lakshman. Nadira's marriage was fixed with internationally acclaimed musician Zia Musafir, son of Janaki's discipline and loyalist Ustad Ghulam Musafir. Ustad isn't happy with the investigation, and especially with the chief officer Sharafuddeen due to several reasons. While doctors confirmed that chances of Nadiya recovering from her coma are very less, Ustad even asks Nadira to sign consent paper for mercy killing of her sister, which she refuses.

Sharafuddeen and team reach their academy and question Aadilakshmi and Lakshman. When Nadira arrives, Sharafuddeen reveals in front of her that Aadilakshmi was always after Janaki Iyer's family wealth which is now entitled primarily to Nadiya, as Janaki Iyer had made Nadiya the heir to the majority her property, including her art academy and Nadira the heir to her art and dance legacy. Sharafuddeen also reveals that the train made a technical stop for two and a half hours at Coimbatore station. The reason why Nadiya didn't travel to her academy which is just 35 minutes from Coimbatore station is unclear. While in her room, someone attacks Nadira from behind, and she runs away after biting hard on the attacker's hand. Sharafuddeen warns Nadira that even her life is at risk now. He also speculates that the Ustaad might have planned to kill Nadiya, leaving Nadira as her sole beneficiary and heir, which would then give him access to Nadiya’s inheritance post Nadira’s marriage to his son. 

While the investigation continues, they discovered that Nadiya had called the Academy's phone number hours before being attacked. Connecting pieces, they find out that someone had used the Academy's official car and entered into Coimbatore station car park area. Upon following the evidences and tracing the path travelled by the car, the team reaches a pond in a rural area. Upon searching the pond thoroughly, they retrieve Nadiya's gun, ID proofs and other belongings. Sharafuddeen concludes that Lakshman attacked Nadiya, which Nadira opposes while talking to Sharafuddeen in private. Sharafudeen says that, if not Aadi Lakshmi's brother it has to be Zia Musafir who might have done this, by taking a break from his world tour, as he was not reportedly in Bahamas on the day Nadiya was stabbed and was in India as per Emigration records. Nadira refuses all claims and defends Zia. Sharafudden decides to take all the suspects and witnesses to Chennai to conduct a scientific Narco-analysis test along with Nadiya who is in a state of coma, by taking the same train.

During the journey, seeing Nadira standing close to the door, Sharafuddeen confronts her. During the chat, Sharafuddeen reveals that amidst that engagement night, the academy's car was taken out and also reveals that it was Nadira who was in it. When Nadira disagrees with this, Sharafuddeen plays an audio evidence from Lakshman who spotted her that night. Finally Sharafuddeen reveals that she is indeed the one who stabbed her twin sister, which Nadira finally agrees. She says that she wanted to prevent Nadiya from selling the academy which was in her ownership.

However, Sharafuddeen reveals one more shocking truth to the astonishment of 'Nadira' - that the one standing in front of him is Nadiya and not Nadira, thereby implying that the other girl unconsciously bound to a hospital bed is the real Nadira. Despite initially objecting to Sharafuddeen's claim, Nadiya's identity is revealed due to her characteristic trait of getting a nosebleed whenever she is angry or upset. Sharafuddeen says that right upon retrieving the real Nadiya's gun, passport and other belongings, the blood group specification in her passport deceived Nadiya's fake identity because Nadira's blood samples from the crime spot were of a different group. It is also revealed that it was Sudarshan, Sharafuddeen's assistant and right hand man who attacked Nadiya in the dark earlier, for the purpose of getting a teeth bite sample from her which matched the bite marks on Nadira's lips. Finally, Sharafuddeen says that he concluded the real killer's identity when Nadiya got a nosebleed upon hearing bad comments about Zia (which Sharafuddeen made purposefully).

The truth was that Nadiya - the shooter was deep in love with Zia, though he had affection only towards her identical twin sister Nadira - the dancer. Ustad and Janaki Iyer fixed the marriage without the consent of Nadiya and she was provoked to mad anger when Nadira boasted about Zia's love to her. She gets angry and decides to kill Nadira, by asking her to pick her up at Coimbatore Station. When Nadira arrived, Nadiya assaulted her and stabs behind her head to let her bleed to death. To appear as assault, she even creates teeth-bites on Nadira's body and carefully switches her dress with Nadira's. She swapped her identity as Nadira, making the real Nadira collapse into a coma state.

Soon after her confession to Sharafuddeen, she jumps out of the moving train and hits hard on to a railway signal thereby killing herself, which makes it the real night of Nadiya’s death. Months later, Zia returns and takes Nadira, who is in a vegetative state, to the US for advanced treatment hoping that she will recover.

Cast
Suresh Gopi as DIG Sharafuddeen Tharamasi IPS, head of Railway Anti-Criminal Task Force
Prithviraj Sukumaran as Zia Musafir-cameo (Ghulam Muzafir's son)
Kavya Madhavan as Nadiya Mether and Nadira Mether, twin sisters and foster-daughters of Janaki Iyer who was the head of Mudrapeetham academy
Siddique as Usthad Ghulam Musafir "G. M.", Loyalist of Janaki Iyer
Rajan P. Dev as Retired SI Mayilvahanam Kathireshan, Tamil Nadu Police
Shammi Thilakan as Sudarshan, an investigator and Sharafuddeen's personal assistant
Suraj Venjarammoodu as TTR Thathamangalam Muthuraj 
Madhupal as Dr. Ajayghosh
Suresh Krishna ... Vijayabhanu, the Railway Division Manager
Suja Karthika as Thulasi Mani, a famous classical dancer 
Urmila Unni as Aadilakshmi, principal of Mudrapeetham 
Kollam Thulasi as Madhavan Master 
Vijayakumar as Balachandran, son of Madhavan
Anoop Chandran as Sundareshan, coach attender
Bindu Panikkar as Rajamma 
Subair as Alexander Chempadan IPS, Railway SP of Palakkad 
Vijay Menon as Kalpathi Seetharaman, a novelist 
Vandana Menon as Sreya Mariya, NDTV Reporter
Sajitha Beti as Dr. Mathangi Varma
Suja Menon as Priya Rose, an actress and daughter of Rajamma
Deepika Mohan as Balu's mother
Joju George as Selvan, team mate of Sharafuddeen
Baburaj as Lakkidi Manikantan, a fake policeman

Release
The film opened to mixed reviews. The movie was released on 27 July 2007. Upon its release, the film received positive reviews from critics and was a box office success. The film ran for 100 days in trivandrum and ernakulam. 

The film was remade in Tamil by Shaji Kailas and released in 2017 as Vaigai Express. Nadiya Kollapetta Rathri become established carrier graph of Suresh Gopi

See also
 Elephants Can Remember
 Geethaanjali
vaigai express

References

External links
 

2000s Malayalam-language films
2007 crime thriller films
2007 films
Indian crime thriller films
Fictional portrayals of the Kerala Police
Fictional portrayals of the Tamil Nadu Police
Films shot in Palakkad
Films shot in Pollachi
Malayalam films remade in other languages
Films directed by K. Madhu
Indian remakes of Thai films